RMK Residential School is an international co-educational boarding school situated at Kavaraipettai in the south Indian state of Tamil Nadu.

It was founded in 2007 by R.S.Munirathinam. The school accepts students from standards (grades) 5-12 and is affiliated with the Central Board of Secondary Education (CBSE). 

In addition to academics, the school offers sports and other activities including Go-karting, horse riding, billiards, swimming, tennis, football, basketball, volleyball, table tennis, cricket, chess, yoga, music and art.

RMK Residential School has an MoU with Bowen Secondary School, Singapore for a School Twinning Program. As per the Program, both schools would have an exchange of students and teachers every year.

The school is headed by principal Sapna N Sankhla.

See also
 List of schools in India
 RMK Engineering College
 RMD Engineering College

References

External links 
 RMK Residential School Website

Private schools in Tamil Nadu
Boarding schools in Tamil Nadu
High schools and secondary schools in Tamil Nadu
Education in Tiruvallur district
Educational institutions established in 2007
2007 establishments in Tamil Nadu